In Greek mythology, Eumaeus (Ancient Greek: Εὔμαιος Eumaios means 'searching well') was Odysseus' swineherd and friend. His father, Ktesios son of Ormenos was king of an island called Syra (present-day Syros in the Greek islands of the Cyclades), although it has also been suggested that Eumaeus referred to Syracuse, Sicily.

Mythology 
When he was a young child a Phoenician sailor seduced his nurse, a slave, who agreed to bring the child among other treasures in exchange for their help in her escape. The nurse was killed by Artemis on the journey by sea, but the sailors continued to Ithaca where Odysseus' father Laertes bought him as a slave. Thereafter he was brought up with Odysseus and his sister Ctimene (or Ktimene) and was treated by Anticleia, their mother, almost as Ctimene's equal.

In Homer's Odyssey, Eumaeus is the first person that Odysseus meets upon his return to Ithaca after fighting in the Trojan War. He has four dogs, 'savage as wild beasts,' who protect his pigs. Although he does not recognize his old master – Odysseus is in disguise – and has his misgivings, Eumaeus treats Odysseus well, offering food and shelter to one whom he thinks is simply a pauper. On being pushed to explain himself, Odysseus spins a distorted tale, misleading Eumaeus into believing that he is the son not of Laertes but of Castor.

The swineherd refuses to accept the assurance that Odysseus is finally on his way home, though he loves him above all others (rendering him especially bitter towards the suitors). Eumaeus has become inured to such claims owing to their frequency during Odysseus' absence, and additionally because he had been misled previously by an impostor from Aetolia. He cautions:Don't you try to gratify or soothe my heart with falsehoods.
It is not for that reason that I shall respect and entertain you, but becauseI fear Zeus, the patron of strangers, and pity you.

God-fearing, suspicious, and scrupulous, Eumaeus delivers probably the oldest extant example of literary sarcasm when, after Odysseus offers a bargain entailing that he be thrown off a cliff should he lose, he answers:
That would be virtuous of me, my friend, and good reputation wouldbe mine among men, for present time alike and hereafter,if first I led you into my shelter, there entertained you as guest,then murdered you and ravished the dear life from you. Then cheerfully I could go and pray to Zeus, son of Kronos.(XIV.402–6, Lattimore translation)

Eumaeus is generous in his offerings to guests and gods (Hermes in particular) and so fair-minded as to strive to divide meals equally between everyone he feeds. The axiom "The god will give, and the god will take away, according to his will, for he can do anything" fairly encapsulates his philosophy.

During his master's long absence, Eumaeus acquires from the Taphians a servant, Mesaulius, with his own ostensibly meagre resources. Mesaulius serves as a waiter during Odysseus' first supper back on Ithaca, in Eumaeus's hut with its owner and his fellow herders.

Eumaeus also welcomes Odysseus' son, Telemachus, when he returns from his voyage to Pylos and Sparta. When Telemachus returns, he visits Eumaeus as soon as he gets off his boat, as Athena directed him. In Eumaeus's hut is Odysseus in disguise. Eumaeus greets Telemachus as a father, expressing his deep worry while Telemachus was gone and his relief now that is safely back. Homer even uses a simile to reiterate the father–son relationship between Telemachus and Eumaeus. He says,
And as a loving father embraces his own sonCome back from a distant land after ten long years,His only son, greatly beloved and much sorrowed for
(Odyssey, Book 16 lines 19–21)
With Odysseus sitting beside Eumaeus and Telemachus, the audience is especially aware of this relationship. 
 
During the slaughter of the suitors, Eumaeus, along with fellow servant Philoetius, assists Telemachus and Odysseus.

See also 
 12972 Eumaios, Jovian asteroid
 Greek mythology in popular culture
 Melanthius, Odysseus's goatherd

Notes

References 

 Graves, Robert, The Greek Myths: The Complete and Definitive Edition. Penguin Books Limited. 2017. 
 Homer, The Odyssey with an English Translation by A.T. Murray, Ph.D. in two volumes. Cambridge, MA., Harvard University Press; London, William Heinemann, Ltd. 1919. . Online version at the Perseus Digital Library. Greek text available from the same website.

External links
 

Characters in the Odyssey
no:Eumaeus